Milton Sims "Mickey" Newbury Jr. (May 19, 1940 – September 29, 2002) was an American songwriter, recording artist, and a member of the Nashville Songwriters Hall of Fame.

Early life and career
Newbury was born in Houston, Texas, on May 19, 1940, to Mamie Ellen (née Taylor) and Milton Newbury. As a teenager, Newbury sang tenor in a moderately successful vocal group called The Embers. The group opened for several famous performers, such as Sam Cooke and Johnny Cash. Although Newbury tried to make a living from his music by singing in clubs, he put his musical career on hold at age 19 when he joined the Air Force. After four years in the military, he again set his sights on making a living as a songwriter. Before long, he moved to Nashville and signed with the prestigious publishing company Acuff-Rose Music. Newbury started out releasing singles of his own, with his first release being "Who's Gonna Cry (When I'm Gone)" in 1964, as well writing songs for other artists. In 1966, country star Don Gibson had a Top Ten country hit with Newbury's "Funny Familiar Forgotten Feelings" while Tom Jones scored a world hit with the same song. In 1968, Newbury saw huge success with four top-five songs across four different charts: "Just Dropped In (To See What Condition My Condition Was In)" #5 on the Pop/Rock chart by Kenny Rogers and the First Edition; "Sweet Memories" #1 on Easy Listening by Andy Williams; "Time is a Thief" #1 on the R&B chart by Solomon Burke; and "Here Comes the Rain Baby" #1 on the Country chart by Eddy Arnold. This feat has not been repeated.

Early career
Based on his phenomenal success as a writer, Newbury scored a solo deal with RCA and recorded Harlequin Melodies. Sonically, the album is drastically different from anything else Newbury would record. The artist largely disowned the album, considering its successor Looks Like Rain his true debut. In contrast to the subtle expressiveness of Newbury's prime work, Harlequin Melodies is overproduced and packed with often distracting instrumental touches, shifting tempos, and strange production effects. Some of the songs on Harlequin Melodies would be re-recorded by Newbury for later albums, with very marked differences. "How Many Times (Must The Piper Be Paid For His Song)" was a highlight of Frisco Mabel Joy; "Good Morning, Dear" and "Sweet Memories" reappeared on Heaven Help the Child, and "Here Comes The Rain Baby" reappeared on A Long Road Home, the last album Newbury released during his lifetime.

Owing to a verbal agreement with Steve Sholes, Newbury was able to get out of his five-year contract with RCA and sign with Mercury, where he could work with his good friends Jerry Kennedy and Bob Beckham. Just about every aspect of his next recording, Looks Like Rain, was unconventional by Nashville's standards at the time, beginning with Newbury's choice of studio. Cinderella Sound was located in a residential area of Madison and was run by guitarist Wayne Moss, who had converted his two-car garage into a recording studio. Newbury's decision to record outside the Nashville studio system would inspire other country singers, such as Waylon Jennings and Willie Nelson, who were also frustrated by the confines of Music City's traditional recording practices. Newbury would record three albums at Cinderella Sound that defied categorization. One significant aspect of their production is the inclusion of sound effects to link the songs, which gave the LPs a conceptual feel and would become a Newbury trademark. His next album, Frisco Mabel Joy, includes his most famous song, "An American Trilogy," later made famous by Elvis Presley. The song is actually a medley of three 19th century songs: "Dixie", a blackface minstrel song composed by Daniel Decatur Emmett that became the unofficial anthem of the Confederacy since the Civil War; "All My Trials", originally a Bahamian lullaby, but closely related to African American spirituals and well known through folk music revivalists; and "The Battle Hymn of the Republic," the marching song of the Union Army during the Civil War. According to Joe Ziemer's Newbury memoir Crystal & Stone, Newbury was moved to perform the song—which had been banned by some southern radio stations—as a protest against censorship. It is the song most associated with Newbury and his highest-charting original recording, reaching #26 in 1972, and #9 on Billboard'''s Easy Listening chart. Newbury's version would remain in the Top 40 for seven weeks. In 1972, Elvis Presley's version reached #66 and peaked at #31 on the Easy Listening chart, but it became the grandiose highlight of his live shows. The song gained worldwide exposure when Presley performed it during his Aloha From Hawaii television special in January 1973.

1970s
Throughout the '70s, Newbury continued producing albums that were critically acclaimed for their unique, mysterious atmosphere and poetic songs, such as Live at Montezuma Hall (1973), Heaven Help the Child (1973), and I Came to Hear the Music (1974). However, his albums did not sell much, in part because of their eclecticism and Newbury's growing disdain for the music business, especially in Nashville. By 1975, the outlaw country movement had captivated the industry, led by Willie Nelson and Waylon Jennings. Meanwhile, Newbury was having difficulty keeping his albums in print. Newbury biographer Joe Ziemer sums up the singer's dilemma in his book Crystal and Stone: "Though diversity derives from aptitude and ability, diversity was Newbury's problem with radio stations. One dominant characteristic of his music is eclecticism, and that's what made his albums unattractive to strict radio formats."

Newbury was not even living in Nashville by 1975, having moved to Oregon with his wife and son. Ironically, Newbury's profile could not have been higher on the radio in 1977, albeit in a referential way; in April, Jennings released the #1 country smash "Luckenbach, Texas (Back to the Basics of Love)," which contains the lines "Between Hank Williams' pain songs, Newbury's train songs..." The song became an instant classic, but most of the listeners who sang along with the tune likely had no idea who Newbury was. Although cited by Jennings, Kris Kristofferson, David Allan Coe, and several other country stars as a primary influence on their songwriting and albums, Newbury had little interest in cashing in on the outlaw country movement, telling Peter O'Brien of the Omaha Rainbow in 1977, "It's just categorising again, making a new pigeon-hole to stick somebody into. You got to be dressed a certain way, you got to be a drinker and a hell-raiser, cuss and make an ass of yourself, act like a kid. I've told 'em I quit playing cowboys when I grew up. I just get turned off by all that."

In 1976, Newbury signed with ABC Hickory Records and recorded three albums: Rusty Tracks (1976), His Eye Is on the Sparrow (1977) and The Sailor (1979). Despite featuring some of the best musicians in Nashville (as well as film scorer Alan Moore), the recordings failed to find an audience, although his work remained highly regarded by critics and fellow artists. In his AllMusic review of The Sailor, Thom Jurek observes, "The Sailor, once again, refused to sell, perhaps because it was too late, perhaps because it was too early—Merle Haggard and George Jones made records that sounded exactly like this only three years later and scored big... Nashville's radio machine wasn't having it, and therefore the public never got the chance to make up its mind."

1980s
In 1980, Newbury was inducted into the Songwriters Hall of Fame, the youngest person to receive the honor at the time. Newbury signed with PolyGram-Mercury and recorded After All These Years in 1981. After that, the singer dropped out of sight, not recording again until 1988. He was not completely inactive during this period, appearing on the Bobby Bare and Friends television show in 1983 and participating on the Canadian program In Session with friend Larry Gatlin the same year. He also toured Australia in 1984 and sang "Sweet Memories" during a "guitar pull" as part of the television special The Door Is Always Open hosted by Waylon Jennings. However, Newbury was disenchanted with the music business, especially after Wesley Rose, who controlled the publishing rights to 300 Newbury compositions, sold the Acuff-Rose publishing company to Opryland USA for $22 million in 1985. Adding to his woes, the IRS came after Newbury as well. "All that came together at one time... So I wasted what should have been the best years of my life just fightin' off the wolves," he later remarked. "Plus I was old... Nobody wanted me anymore." In 1988, Airborne Records planned a release in which Newbury demos were treated with synthesizers and other then-contemporary production effects. These demos stemmed from sessions with producer Larry Butler in Nashville in March 1983 and featured new-age synthesizer sounds, which Newbury came to loathe. "I was so drunk then," he later explained. "I hate those cuts and never want to hear 'em again." Newbury also claimed to have thrown a cassette of the recordings on the ground and stomped on it. Newbury was aghast when he heard that Airborne was planning to release the recordings, and had even printed up the album art, but after learning that no CDs or cassettes had yet been made, Newbury instead re-recorded the songs Airborne planned to use, and the album was released with these new recordings, effectively Newbury's first recordings in years. Newbury recorded the album solo with accompaniment from violinist Marie Rhines.

Later life
In 1994, Newbury resurfaced with the live album Nights When I Am Sane. A year later he was diagnosed with pulmonary fibrosis, which would impact his ability to record and perform for the remainder of his life. In 1996, he released Lulled by the Moonlight, his first collection of new compositions since 1981. Several live recordings followed, including Live in England (1998) and It Might as Well Be the Moon (1999). The final album released in Newbury's lifetime was the autobiographical A Long Road Home in 2002. Like most of Newbury's albums, it did not chart but was critically acclaimed, with No Depression's Peter Blackstock calling it "a masterpiece." Newbury died in Springfield, Oregon, following a battle with emphysema on September 29, 2002, aged 62.

Legacy
Ralph Emery referred to Newbury as the first "hippie-cowboy," and along with Johnny Cash and Roger Miller, he was one of the first to rebel against the conventions of the Nashville music society. The influence of the production methods can be heard in the albums Waylon Jennings went on to record in the 1970s (with instrumentation highly unconventional for country music), and his poetically sophisticated style of songwriting was highly influential on Kris Kristofferson, who later proclaimed, "I learned more about songwriting from him than any other writer... He was my hero and still is.". Newbury gained a reputation as a "songwriter's songwriter" and a mentor to others. It was Newbury who convinced Roger Miller to record Kristofferson's "Me & Bobby McGee", which went on to launch Kristofferson as country music's top songwriter. Newbury is also responsible for getting Townes Van Zandt and Guy Clark to move to Nashville and pursue careers as songwriters. Van Zandt later described how Newbury's voice impressed him: "I can't really call it 'explain' but I'd tried to tell Jeanene (Van Zandt's wife) about the sound of Mickey's voice and the guitar on a good night at the same time. It's hard; you can't do it. It's like from outer space. I've heard about people trying to explain a color to a blind person... There's no way to do it." During a show in Galway, Ireland, John Prine said, "Mickey Newbury is probably the best songwriter ever."

According to his official website, Newbury has had over 1,500 versions of his songs recorded across many genres of music. His work would be recorded by singers and songwriters such as Johnny Cash, Vampire Weekend, Bob Luman, Roy Orbison, Tennessee Ernie Ford, Bill Monroe, Johnny Rodriguez, Hank Snow, Ray Charles, Tony Rice, Jerry Lee Lewis, Tammy Wynette, Ray Price, Don Gibson, Ronnie Milsap, Brenda Lee, Charlie Rich, Lynn Anderson, David Allan Coe, Sammi Smith, Joan Baez, Tom Jones, Willie Nelson, Waylon Jennings, John Denver, Kenny Rogers, Steve Von Till, B.B. King, Linda Ronstadt, Dax Riggs, Bobby "Blue" Bland, and Bill Callahan, among many others. Elvis Presley's cover of "An American Trilogy" is especially famous. Presley began performing the song in concert in 1972 and released it as a single. He performed it in the 1972 documentary Elvis on Tour and in his 1973 international satellite telecast Elvis—Aloha from Hawaii.

In 2020, fellow Nashville Songwriters Hall of Fame member Gretchen Peters released an album of Newbury songs entitled The Night You Wrote That Song: The Songs of Mickey Newbury'', which received critical acclaim and debuted at  #1 on the FAI Folk chart and reached #1 on the UK Official Country Artists Albums Chart.

Many of Newbury's songs, such as "The Thirty-Third of August", "The Future Is Not What It Used To Be", and "Just Dropped In (To See What Condition My Condition Was In)", delve into the dark recesses of the human psyche. Newbury, who battled depression in his life, later reflected, "How many people have listened to my songs and thought, 'He must have a bottle of whiskey in one hand and a pistol in the other.' Well, I don't. I write my sadness."

Discography

Studio albums

Live albums

Compilation albums

Singles

References
Citations

Bibliography

External links
 
 List of Newbury's songs covered by other artists

1940 births
2002 deaths
American country singer-songwriters
American male singer-songwriters
Musicians from Houston
Singer-songwriters from Oregon
Singer-songwriters from Texas
Deaths from pulmonary fibrosis
Elektra Records artists
RCA Records artists
Mercury Records artists
Drag City (record label) artists
20th-century American singers
Country musicians from Texas
20th-century American male singers